Bore or Boré is a surname. Notable people with the surname include:

Albert Bore (born 1946), British nuclear physicist and politician
Etienne de Boré (1741–1820), first mayor of New Orleans
Eugène Boré (1809–1878), Roman Catholic missionary and linguist
Michael Bore (1947–2017), English former cricketer
Peter Bore (born 1987), English footballer
Thor Bjarne Bore (1938–2019), Norwegian newspaper editor and politician